The Principles of Lust is a 2003 British drama film directed by Penny Woolcock based on the (unpublished) novel 'The Zero-Sum Game' by Tim Cooke.

Cast
 Alec Newman as Paul
 Marc Warren as Billy
 Sienna Guillory as Juliette
 Julian Barratt as Phillip
 Daniela Ruah as unnamed orgy character

Plot
Paul (Alec Newman) is a struggling writer and is driving his car to a meeting at an art gallery when he is involved in a collision with another vehicle. The other driver accuses Paul of being at fault, but when he shouts back, the other driver apologises and tells him his own car is not insured, and then persuades him to go for a drink in a local pub, introducing himself as Billy (Marc Warren).

Billy is accompanied by a young woman named Hole (Lara Clifton) who is a striptease performer at the pub. When Hole has finished her performance, Billy takes Paul into a back room of the pub and introduces him to his group of mates who live a life of drugs, sex, and violence.

The film then follows Paul as his life veers between a relationship with Juliette (Sienna Guillory) and her son, and the debauched excesses of wild nights out with Billy and Hole and their mates.

Release
The Principles of Lust premiered 29 January 2003 at the International Film Festival Rotterdam. It was released on DVD 26 July 2004.

References

External links
 
 
 screendaily.com - The Principles of Lust review

2003 films
2000s English-language films
British erotic drama films
2000s erotic drama films
2003 drama films
2000s British films